Caproic acid, also known as hexanoic acid, is the carboxylic acid derived from hexane with the chemical formula .  It is a colorless oily liquid with an odor that is fatty, cheesy, waxy, and like that of goats or other barnyard animals.  It is a fatty acid found naturally in various animal fats and oils, and is one of the chemicals that gives the decomposing fleshy seed coat of the ginkgo its characteristic unpleasant odor. It is also one of the components of vanilla and cheese. The primary use of caproic acid is in the manufacture of its esters for use as artificial flavors, and in the manufacture of hexyl derivatives, such as hexylphenols. Salts and esters of caproic acid are known as caproates or hexanoates. Several progestin medications are caproate esters, such as hydroxyprogesterone caproate and gestonorone caproate.

Two other acids are named after goats: caprylic acid (C8) and capric acid (C10). Along with caproic acid, they account for 15% of the fat in goat's milk.

Caproic, caprylic, and capric acids (capric is a crystal- or wax-like substance, whereas the other two are mobile liquids) are not only used for the formation of esters, but also commonly used "neat" in: butter, milk, cream, strawberry, bread, beer, nut, and other flavors.

See also
 List of saturated fatty acids
 List of carboxylic acids

References

Fatty acids
Alkanoic acids